Repetition is an 1843 book by Søren Kierkegaard and published under the pseudonym Constantin Constantius to mirror its titular theme. Constantin investigates whether repetition is possible, and the book includes his experiments and his relation to a nameless patient known only as the Young Man.

The Young Man has fallen in love with a girl, proposed marriage, the proposal has been accepted, but now he has changed his mind. Constantin becomes the young man's confidant. Coincidentally, the problem that the Young Man had is the same problem Kierkegaard had with Regine Olsen. He had proposed to her, she had accepted but he had changed his mind. Kierkegaard was accused of "experimenting with the affections of his fiancée".

Charles K. Bellinger says Either/Or, Fear and Trembling and Repetition are works of fiction, "novelistic" in character; they focus on the boundaries between different spheres of existence, such as the aesthetic and the ethical, and the ethical and the religious; they often focus on the subject of marriage; they can be traced back to Kierkegaard's relationship with Regine." There is much in this work that is autobiographical in nature. How much is left up to the reader. Kierkegaard explores the conscious choices this Young Man makes. He had written about repetition previously in his unpublished book Johannes Climacus.

Kierkegaard published Fear and Trembling, Three Upbuilding Discourses, 1843 and Repetition all on the same date, October 16, 1843. Abraham was the main character in Fear and Trembling and the Three Upbuilding Discourses were about love.  Repetition presents a noticeable contrast between the other two books that is almost comical. He takes up the idea of repetition again in his 1844 work The Concept of Anxiety where he explores the concepts of sin and guilt more directly. The book could be the counterpart of Goethe's Clavigo, which Kierkegaard dealt with in Either/Or.

Structure 
 Part One: Report by Constantin Constantius
 Part Two: Repetition
 Letters from the Young Man, August 15 – January 13
 Incidental Observations by Constantin Constantius
 Letter from the Young Man, May 31
 Concluding Letter by Constantin Constantius, Copenhagen, August 1843

Report by Constantin Constantius 
Constantin believes that "repetition and recollection are the same movement, except in opposite directions, for what is recollected has been, is repeated backward." An individual can remember some past event or emotional experience with intensity. That individual might try to "repeat pleasure continuously and eternalize the pleasure in the temporal". This is what Constantin is trying to accomplish. He hopes that Repetition will become a new philosophical category. That it will trump Hegel and explain the relation between the Eleatics and Heraclitus. "Mediation” is a foreign word; “repetition” is a good Danish word, according to him.

He reports that he has met a melancholic young man and has decided to become his confidant. He says, "an observer fulfills his duties well, he is to be regarded as a secret agent in a higher service, for the observer’s art is to expose what is hidden". During his conversation with the Young Man he comes to understand that he is in love but he talks about his love as though it were just a memory. He says the Young Man "was deeply and fervently in love, that was clear, and yet a few days later he was able to recollect his love. He was essentially through with the entire relationship."  
His observations lead him to conclude that the young man really isn't in love, but that the girl (he never calls her a woman) is "the occasion that awakened the poetic in him and made him a poet." He calls him the "sorrowful knight of recollection’s only happy love." He has had his first love but that's not anywhere near the experience of marriage. Kierkegaard says the following in Either/Or,  "The question, namely, is this: Can this love be actualized? After having conceded everything up to this point, you perhaps will say: Well, it is just as difficult to actualize marriage as to actualize first love. To that I must respond: No, for in marriage there is a law of motion. First love remains an unreal in itself that never acquires inner substance because it moves only in the external medium. In the ethical and religious intention, marital love has the possibility of an inner history and is as different from first love as the historical is from the unhistorical. This love is strong, stronger than the whole world, but the moment it doubts it is annihilated; it is like a sleepwalker who is able to walk in the most dangerous places with the complete security but plunges down when someone calls his name. Marital love is armed, for in the intention not only is attentiveness directed to the surrounding world but the will is directed toward itself, toward the inner world." The Young Man, like Byron, "declares that love is heaven and marriage hell."

Constantin, "the aesthetic schemer", tells the Young Man he should become a deceiver. He says, "Be inconstant, nonsensical; do one thing one day and another the next, but without passion, in an utterly careless way that does not, however, degenerate into inattention, because, on the contrary, the external attentiveness must be just as great as ever but altered to a formal function lacking all inwardness.

He then goes to Berlin, because he had been there once before and he wants to see if he can repeat the same experience he had the first time. He goes to the same place he stayed on his first journey and finds that his landlord is now married. “The landlord went on to prove the esthetic validity of marriage. He succeeded marvelously, just as well as he had the last time in proving the perfection of bachelorhood.”. He tries to find repetition at the theater but it eludes him, he tries the coffee shop and finally says, "I had discovered that there simply is no repetition and had verified it by having it repeated in every possible way". Stuart Dalton from The University of Hartford regards Repetition essentially as a comedy and there is humor in much of the book. Kierkegaard wrote humorously about the idea of repetition in Concluding Unscientific Postscript to Philosophical Fragments, he said,

Repetition 
Constantin is still pursuing repetition. Now he's seeking a "sameness that has a far more anesthetic power than the most whimsical amusements" when he gets a letter from the Young Man demanding that he keep "unbroken silence" about the whole affair he was speaking to him about and that he will not be seeing him anymore. He will correspond by mail only. Constantin says, "This, then, is the thanks one gets for having trained oneself every day for years to have only an objective theoretical interest in people, in everyone for whom the idea is in motion! At one time, I tried to assist the idea in him; now I am reaping the harvest, namely, I am supposed to be and also not to be both being and nothing, entirely as he so pleases, and not to receive the slightest appreciation for being able to be that and thereby to help him out of the contradiction." He continues to diagnose him. 

The Young Man tells him he will be going to Job for help and will write his reports to Constantin.

Letters from the Young Man, August 15 – May 31 
"Two years after the death of his father, in the year 1840, Søren Kierkegaard entered into an engagement of marriage with a young girl living in Copenhagen, whose name was Regine Olsen. However, he was very soon brought to the insight that no marriage was possible for him. He sought to break the engagement, but succeeded only in stirring the heart of his fiancé to a passionate outburst, in which she begged him not to leave her. Moved profoundly by the ardor of her love he sought to emancipate her and himself through the adoption of a very involved and curious method." Journal entries seem to indicate that Kierkegaard was wary of marriage as early as 1838 and that he had a definite reason for breaking off the engagement.

Did he use the method endorsed by Constantin and become a deceiver? The letters from the Young Man are either written in relation to Regine or they are a passionate cry for freedom. He wanted to find a truth to live and die for. The letters describe his inner struggle against the social norms of his time. Must he keep his pledge because the social order demands that he does it?

First he blames his psychologist but he still needs him. Existential philosophy calls this Ressentiment. 

Then he blames the girl.

Then he appeals to Job.  Later, in Edifying Discourses in Various Spirits (1847), Kierkegaard discusses Job's guilt again. "Job’s friends did not have any criteria for what it means to suffer as one who is innocent before God. The highest that the Jews knew was a piety such as Job’s, and this is why it was doubly arrogant and doubly unjust of the friends to speak in this way of Job. The Christian, however, knows that there is only one, but also that there is one, who suffered before God as innocent. No one dares to compare himself to him or measure himself by his standard; between him and every human between there is an eternal difference. That is why it now applies with renewed clarity that in relation to God a human being always suffers as guilty."

Then he questions his own existence and the concept of guilt. Existential philosophers call this an existential crisis. 

Then he demands his rights. Kierkegaard is developing his concept of individuality. The Young Man wants to stand out from the crowd and make his own decisions about his own life. 

His question is never what is love, but how do I know I'm in love, how do you know you're in love? Too many people want to read about love in order to find out what love is. Kierkegaard says one must act, not just think about acting. His letter dated January 13 states he is now married and doing his best to be a husband.

Contrasting Abraham in Fear and Trembling with the Young Man creates an excellent comedy when taken together. Abraham wasn't anxious about the social order, he just followed God but the Young Man is overflowing with anxiety about what his friends will say about him, and he followed Job. Kierkegaard wrote in Fear and Trembling: "It would be altogether desirable if esthetics would sometime attempt to begin where for so many years it has ended-in the illusion of magnanimity. As soon as it did this, it would be working hand in hand with the religious, for this is the only power that can rescue the esthetic from its battle with the ethical." Kierkegaard says, "I perceived that he was a poet-if for no other reason I saw it in the fact that a situation that would have been taken easily in stride by a lesser mortal expanded into a world event for him." On December 6, 1843 Kierkegaard published his Four Upbuilding Discourses, he explains this Young Man's relation to Job in the following way, In tempestuous times, when the foundation of existence is tottering, when the moment shivers in anxious expectancy of what may come, when every explanation falls silent at the spectacle of the wild tumult, when a person’s innermost being groans in despair and in “bitterness of soul” cries to heaven, then Job still walks along, at the generation’s side and guarantees that there is a victory, guarantees that even if the single individual loses in the struggle, there is still a God who, just as he proportions every temptation humanly, even though the person did not withstand the temptation, will still make a way out such as he can bear it – yes, even more gloriously than any human expectancy. Only the defiant person could wish that Job did not exist, that he could completely divest his soul of the last love still present in the wail of despair, that he could whine about life, indeed curse life in such a way that there would not be even an echo of faith and trust and humility in his words, that in his defiance he could stifle the scream in order not to create the impression that there was anyone whom it provoked. Only a soft person could wish that Job did not exist, that he could instead leave off thinking, the sooner the better, could give up all movement in the most disgusting powerlessness, could blot himself out in the most wretched and miserable forgetfulness. Eighteen Upbuilding Discourses, Four Upbuilding Discourses, The Lord Gave, And The Lord Took Away; Blessed Be The Name Of The Lord. (Job 1:20-21)  p. 111

Incidental Observations by Constantin Constantius 
Constantin has renounced all theorizing but still thinks about the Young Man and the girl. As far as he's concerned the Young Man is a poet. He says, "A poet seems to be born to be a fool for the girls. If a girl made a fool of him to his face, he would think of it generous of her."

The Young Man writes once more, on May 31, to let Constantin know that the "girl" is married. Kierkegaard-The Young Man says, "I belong to the idea. When it beckons me, I will follow; when it makes an appointment, I wait for it day and night; no one calls me to dinner, no one expects me for supper. When the idea calls, I abandon everything, or, more correctly, I have nothing to abandon. I defraud no one, I sadden no one by being loyal to it; my spirit is not saddened by my having to make another sad. When I come home, no one reads my face, no one questions my demeanor. No one coaxes out of my being an explanation that not even I myself can give to another, whether I am beatific in joy or dejected in desolation, whether I have won life or lost it." Repetition p. 221

Kierkegaard as well as the other two characters in the story belong to the idea of what a marriage is but not to the actuality of a real marriage. Kierkegaard calls the Young Man's behaviour criminal.

Concluding Letter by Constantin Constantius, Copenhagen, August 1843 
Constantin addresses his readers. He says,

Criticism 
August Strindberg referred to Kierkegaard in his book To Damascus (1900). Part 1 is compared to "Kierkegaard's Gentagelse" by Gunnar Ollen who translated the book. 
The Encyclopedia of Religion and Ethics, 1915, had a short article about Søren Kierkegaard. They wrote, In Gentagelsen (' Repetition,' October 1843), Kierkegaard sketches an abortive transition to the religious sphere. 'Repetition' is one of his characteristic ideas; it signifies persistence in, and faithfulness to, a chosen course of life, and is thus opposed to the (esthetic standpoint, with constancy only in change. But Kierkegaard also gives the word a more special meaning—that rather of 'resumption' (Gentagelse, 'taking again')—implying that each higher stage of life carries with it the lower in a transfigured form. Gentagelsen tells of a young man who seeks to pass from the (esthetic to the religious sphere, but for want of a true penitence becomes merely a romanticist; i.e., he simply resumes his old self; and his case is contrasted with that of Job, who humbled himself utterly before God, and at last regained all that he had lost, and more—the true ' repetition."

Lev Shestov was a philosopher who wondered how Russia had missed Kierkegaard. He understood Repetition in the following way. "Here is how Kierkegaard tells of this in his Repetition: "The greatness of Job is therefore not that he said, 'The Lord hath given, the Lord hath taken away, blessed be the name of the Lord' - what he indeed said at first and did not later repeat... The greatness of Job lies in the fact that the passion of freedom is not choked or calmed in him by any false expression... Job demonstrates the compass of his world view through the firmness with which he knows how to eschew all crafty ethical evasions and cunning wiles." Everything that Kierkegaard says of Job can also be said of himself. And here is the closing passage in which Kierkegaard says, "Job is blessed and received everything back again double. This is what people call a repetition... Thus there is a repetition. When does it come? When did it come for Job? When all conceivable human certainty and probability was on the side of impossibility." And, according to Kierkegaard's deep conviction, this repetition will "obtain a very important role in the newer philosophy," for "the new philosophy will teach that all of life is a repetition." Kierkegaard As A Religious Philosopher, by Lev Shestov, 1938

Kierkegaard wrote, What kind of power is it that wants to deprive me of my honor and my pride and do it in such a meaningless way! Am I inevitably guilty, a deceiver, whatever I do, even if I do nothing? Or have I perhaps gone mad? Then the best thing to do would be to lock me up, for people cravenly fear particularly the utterances of the insane and the dying. What does it mean: mad? What must I do to enjoy civic esteem, to be regarded as sensible? Why does no one answer? I offer a reasonable reward to anyone who invents a new world! I have set forth the alternatives. Is there anyone so clever that he knows more than two? But if he does not know more, then it certainly is nonsense that I am mad, unfaithful, and a deceiver, while the girl is faithful and reasonable and esteemed by the people. Repetition p. 202  He is always asking himself questions just as Johann Gottlieb Fichte had done in his 1800 book, The Destination of Man, also called The Vocation of Man where he wrote against the easy answer for every question by vain repetitions.The book is therefore not intended for philosophers by profession, who will find in it nothing that may not be found in other writings of the same author. It is intended to be intelligible to all readers who are able really to understand a book at all. Those who have accustomed themselves merely to the repetition of certain sets of phrases in varied order, and who mistake this operation of memory for that of the understanding, will probably find it unintelligible. It ought to exercise on the reader an attractive and animating power, raising him from the sensuous world, to that which is above sense. The author at least has not performed his task without some of this happy inspiration.

Kierkegaard was influential in Martin Buber's 'I and Thou' philosophy and Martin Heidegger's development of the "new philosophical category" Dasein.

Alicia Borinsky of Boston University took up Kierkegaard's Repetition in her 1981-1982 article On Translation and the Art of Repetition. The two characters talk so they can silence (translate) each other. Kierkegaard imagines still another exchange in his essay, the one between a reader and Constantine Constantinus. There seems to be no escape from the interpretative chain, the police function of the observer. Poetry appears in this essay as the effect of a loss. The two or four characters are linked by a paranoid system of translation that stands -- as Kierkegaard would want us to believe -- for the nature of every human exchange and constitutes the precondition for poetic repetition. … In Repetition Kierkegaard set out an exemplary subject for one of the main concerns of poetry, bringing hidden things to light. His way of inquiry is translation with its connotations of interpretation, betrayal, silencing.  On Translation and the Art of Repetition by Alicia Borinsky P. 220 Dispositio Vol VII No. 19-20  

Rollo May wrote a history of Existentialism from the psychological point of view. He said, 

Kierkegaard was very concerned about his relationship with God. C. Stephen Evans, says that "Kierkegaard regarded himself as a psychologist. Three of his books, The Concept of Anxiety, Repetition, and The Sickness Unto Death, are designated as psychological by their subtitles, and he frequently called himself a psychologist in his journal. … Imagine a naïve Christian who knows nothing about psychology as a science-let’s call him “Kirk”-engaged in conversation with a knowledgeable psychologist-“Dr. John.” Dr. John tells Kirk that psychology models itself after the natural sciences and attempts to gain a scientific understanding of human behavior and mental processes. Kirk asks Dr. John what psychologists think about God and God’s relationship to human beings. Dr. John replies that individual psychologists have different beliefs about God. He himself is a Christian, he tells Kirk, and of course, for him any ultimate understanding of human beings requires a theological perspective too. But, he hastens to add, his personal religious beliefs do not enter into psychology as a scientific discipline because science restricts itself to the natural realm, which can be studied by empirical methods.Dr. John’s answer leaves Kirk dissatisfied. He has a lot of lingering misgivings. Kirk can understand that science may have to limit itself to the empirically observable, but he questions the value, or even the truthfulness, of the knowledge gained by such a science. After all, he thinks, isn’t the most important thing about human beings their relationship to God? Can anyone hope to understand them without understanding them in this light?" Søren Kierkegaard's Christian Psychology: Insight for Counseling and Pastoral Care By C. Stephen Evans, Kierkegaard as a Psychologist, p. 25-26

Clare Carlisle described the internal and external struggle that every existing individual has to go through. "The struggle between philosophy and existence (often a struggle internal to the individual, especially to the intellectual and perhaps academic individual who is this text’s likely reader) is essential to Kierkegaard’s dramatization of his conflict with Hegel. Throughout Kierkegaard’s pseudonymous authorship the ‘abstract thinker’, the ‘pitiful professorial figure is criticized from the perspective of the existing individual. Challenging the Hegelian view that the Concept expresses the highest form of truth, texts such as Repetition constitute ‘a polemic against the truth as knowledge’ and suggest instead that truth must be grasped in terms of ‘subjectivity’ or ‘inwardness’."

Both Constantin and the Young Man had the power to act as single individuals instead of trying to become world historically famous or worrying about the crowd but neither of them used the power. They both just pursued the idea. Kierkegaard says of them, 

Later, in The Concept of Anxiety, Kierkegaard discusses this power again in terms of the eternal. His idea of the eternal is comparable to Nietzsche's idea of eternal return, only backwards. Niels Nymann Eriksen has written about Kierkegaard's category of repetition. This book explores "the Other" and "Becoming" as well as "Recollection" and "Repetition."

Notes

References

Sources

Primary sources 
 Either/Or Part I Edited by Victor Eremita, February 20, 1843, translated by David F. Swenson and Lillian Marvin Swenson Princeton University Press 1971
 Either/Or Part II. Translated by Howard and Edna Hong. Princeton, 1988, 
 Repetition, A Venture in Experimental Psychology, by Constantin Constantius, October 16, 1843, by Søren Kierkegaard, Edited and Translated by Howard V. Hong and Edna H. Hong, 1983, Princeton University Press
 Eighteen Upbuilding Discourses, Søren Kierkegaard 1843-1844 Copyright 1990 by Howard V. Hong Princeton University Press
 Stages on Life's Way, Søren Kierkegaard, April 30, 1845, Edited and Translated by Howard V. Hong and Edna H. Hong 1988, Princeton University Press
 Concluding Unscientific Postscript to Philosophical Fragments Volume I, by Johannes Climacus, edited by Søren Kierkegaard, Copyright 1846 – Edited and Translated by Howard V. Hong and Edna H. Hong 1992 Princeton University Press
 Søren Kierkegaard's Journals & Papers

Secondary sources 
 Soren Kierkegaard Encyclopædia of Religion and Ethics, edited by James Hastings, 1908 p. 696-700
 Soren Kierkegaard , by David F. Swenson, Scandinavian studies and notes, Volume 6 No. 7 August 1921 Editor George T Flom University of Illinois Published in Menasha, Wisconsin
 Lectures on the Religious Thought of Søren Kierkegaard, Eduard Geismar, Augsburg Publishing Co 1937
 Kierkegaard  &  the  Existential  Philosophy, by Lev Shestov, 1938,  translated from Russian by Elinor Hewitt, Ohio University Press, 1969.
 A Very Short Life of Kierkegaard, by Charles K. Bellinger
 The Discovery of Being, By Rollo May 1983, W. W. Norton & Company, 1994
 Soren Kierkegaard's Christian Psychology: Insight for Counseling and Pastoral Care By C. Stephen Evans, Regent College Publishing, 1995
 Kierkegaard's Repetition as a Comedy in Two Acts, by Stuart Dalton, University of Hartford
 Kierkegaard's category of repetition: a reconstruction, By Niels Nymann Eriksen, Published by, Walter de Gruyter, 2000
 Dan Anthony Storm on Repetition

External links 
 

Books by Søren Kierkegaard
1843 books
Existentialist books
Philosophical novels
Works published under a pseudonym